The Chief Langalibalele Rifles (formerly known as the Cape Town Rifles and Duke of Edinburgh's Own Rifles) is a reserve infantry regiment of the South African Army.

History

Origin
The Regiment was founded on 28 November 1855, as the Cape Rifle Corps.  It was the first volunteer unit in the Cape Colony.

Other names
It was also known as the Cape Royal Rifles, and later as the Cape Town Volunteer Rifles.

Association with Prince Alfred
On 30 September 1867, Prince Alfred, Duke of Edinburgh granted the CTVR the title the Duke of Edinburgh's Own Rifles, after it had formed a guard of honour for him during a visit to Cape Town.  The nickname "the Dukes" appears to have come into use in the 1880s.

Role
The Regiment's original purpose was home defence, to supplement the British Army garrison which was stationed in Cape Town.  It initially consisted of two companies, but later grew to five, the fifth (formed in 1859) being a Scottish company.  The Scottish company left the Regiment, and became a unit in its own right, in 1861, and disbanded in 1866.  During the depression of the 1860s and early 1870s, the Regiment shrank to only one company, and was one of the few volunteer units to remain in existence

Early Campaigns
On the outbreak of the 9th Frontier War in 1877, the Regiment volunteered for active service, and fielded a small contingent which served in the Transkei from October 1877 to January 1878.  Hundreds of volunteers joined the Regiment, and it was reorganised in April 1878, into six companies. 

Another contingent served in the 
Transkei from February to May 1879, to take the place of a British garrison unit which had been re-deployed to Zululand because of the Anglo-Zulu War.

Half the Regiment served in the Basutoland Gun War in Basutoland (now Lesotho) from September 1880 to March 1881, and it was there that the Regiment suffered its first casualties.

The Regiment continued to grow after this period of campaigning, and a new Scottish company was formed in 1882.  It transferred to the newly formed Cape Town Highlanders in July 1885.  In 1891, the Dukes took over the Cape Town Irish Volunteer Rifles, and in 1894 the Regiment formed a mounted company.

From February to August 1897, the Dukes were on active service in Bechuanaland, as part of a government military operation to capture dissident Tswana leaders who had taken refuge in the Langberg mountains.

Anglo-Boer War

The Regiment played an active role in the Anglo-Boer War (1899–1902).  Initially, it was deployed to protect a long stretch of the railway line through the Western Cape.  In May 1900, it was assigned to Lt Gen Sir Charles Warren's column, to recapture areas of Griqualand West from Boer and Cape Rebel forces.  The Dukes' commanding officer, Lt Col William Spence, was killed in action during a Boer attack on the column's base on the farm Fabers Puts on 30 May 1900.

From June 1900 until the end of the war in May 1902, the Regiment was split up into small detachments, which manned outposts and blockhouses in the northern Cape.  

A second battalion was formed in Cape Town in January 1901, and in October 1901 it became a separate unit and was renamed the Colonial Light Horse.  It disbanded after the end of the war.

Citizen Force

Together with most colonial volunteer units, the Dukes were embodied in the Active Citizen Force of the new Union Defence Force on 1 July 1913.  The word "volunteer" was removed from the title, which then became "2nd Infantry (Duke of Edinburgh's Own Rifles)".  The numerical designation was dropped in 1932.

World War I

Like other CF units, the Dukes played a limited role in World War I, because the South African forces were restricted to operations in southern Africa.  The Regiment was on garrison duty in Cape Town from October 1914 to January 1915, and was deployed in German South West Africa (now Namibia) from February to July 1915.  It was used in a supporting role, and saw no action.

After the Dukes returned from GSWA, more than a hundred members volunteered for service in the new 1st SA Infantry Regiment, which served in Egypt and then on the Western Front in France.  Some others volunteered for service in the British forces, and one "Duke", Andrew Beauchamp-Proctor, became a Royal Air Force pilot and finished the war as South Africa's most highly decorated serviceman ever.

World War II

The Dukes served again in World War II.  As a unit of the 1st SA Infantry Brigade, the Regiment served in East Africa (Kenya, Somaliland and Ethiopia) from July 1940 to May 1941, and in North Africa (Egypt and Libya) from June 1941 to December 1942 as part of the 1st SA Infantry Division.  The Dukes earned eleven battle honours in these two campaigns.

From February 1943 to March 1945, the Regiment was based in the Transvaal, in South Africa, as a tank training battalion.  Being under-strength, it was temporarily amalgamated with the Rand Light Infantry.  In March 1945, the DEOR/RLI amalgamated with the Transvaal Scottish, to form the "DSR" battalion for service in Italy.  However, operations in Italy ended before the battalion was ready for deployment.  It was used for peacekeeping and security duties in Italy until the end of 1945.

Post-war

When South Africa became a republic on 31 May 1961, the Duke of Edinburgh's Own Rifles were renamed the "Cape Town Rifles".  The official title was changed again, in October 1966, to "Cape Town Rifles (Dukes)".  The Regiment was granted the Freedom of the City of Cape Town on 10 October 1967.  National service, i.e. conscription of all medically fit White men, was introduced in 1968.

Border War

The Dukes were converted into a counter-insurgency (COIN) unit in 1974, and served several tours of duty in the Border War, i.e. South African operations against the People's Liberation Army of Namibia.  The whole battalion served in Owambo in 1977, and a small contingent served there again in December 1978.  Companies served in East Caprivi in 1979, in Kavango in 1980, and in Owambo in 1981 and 1983.

State of Emergency

The Dukes were deployed on internal security duties in various part of South Africa in 1985, 1986, 1988, and 1990, during the 1985-1990 State of Emergency, which was the government's response to the armed liberation struggle by the African National Congress and others.

Present
Since 1994, the Regiment has been a volunteer unit, and it celebrated its 150th anniversary in 2005 and continues to serve both on external and internal deployments.

Name change
In August 2019, 52 Reserve Force units had their names changed to reflect the diverse military history of South Africa. The Cape Town Rifles became the Chief Langalibalele Rifles, and have 3 years to design and implement new regimental insignia.

Regimental Symbols
The regimental badge, worn since 1964, is an eight-pointed star, with a battlemented turret covering the top point.  An anchor is superimposed on the turret.  In the centre of the star is a stringed bugle horn, surrounded by a buckled strap inscribed "Semper Eadem".
The previous badge, dating from the 1880s, was the star of the Order of the Thistle, with a royal duke's coronet covering the top point, and the regiment's title around the thistle in the centre of the star.
The regimental helmet flash is pale gold with a pointed top, and a cherry red chevron across the centre.  A hackle (plume) of cherry and gold feathers is worn behind it.  The beret flash, worn behind the badge, is a diamond-shape divided horizontally into pale gold over cherry red.
The Cape Town Rifles are the oldest regiment of Cape Town's five traditional volunteer regiments: the Cape Field Artillery, the Cape Town Rifles (Dukes), the Cape Town Highlanders, the Cape Garrison Artillery and Regiment Westelike Provinsie.

Previous Dress Insignia

Alliances
 – The Rifles

Battle honours

Gaika-Gcaleka 1877, Transkei 1879, Basutoland 18801881, Bechuanaland 1897, South Africa 18991902, South-West Africa  19141915, East Africa 19401941, El Wak, The Juba, Combolcia, Amba Alagi, Western Desert 19411943, Sidi Rezegh, Gazala, Alem Hamza, Alamein Defence, El Alamein

Leadership

References

Bibliography
 
 
 
 

Infantry regiments of South Africa
Military units and formations in Cape Town
Military units and formations established in 1855
Military units and formations of the Second Boer War
Military units and formations of the British Empire
Military units and formations of South Africa in World War I
Military units and formations of South Africa in World War II
Military units and formations of South Africa in the Border War
Military units and formations of the Cold War